Apu Mallku is an Aymara title meaning "supreme leader" or "king" conferred on a Mallku or "prince". The Apu Mallku's mandate is to oversee the vast network of Ayllus, an ancient Andean system of governing councils that predates even the Inca empire. It appears that the mandate of the Apu Mallku was initially restricted to the Collasuyu (the traditional Aymara lands of Bolivia, parts of Peru and northern Chile) but it could now be interpreted (since a resolution in 2000) to extend to the bounds of the much larger former Inca realm of the Tawantinsuyu which stretched throughout the Andes incorporating the modern states of Bolivia, Peru, Ecuador, Chile and Argentina. The self-appellation for the people of this combined territory is Qullana.

It would seem through the ayllus system there is a large degree of coordination between both the Aymara and the Quechua nations. Apu Mallku was the title bestowed upon Evo Morales on 21 January 2006 at Tiwanaku, the day before his official inauguration as president of Bolivia.

Apu Mallku

 Juan Evo Morales Ayma, the incumbent (2006– )
 Antonio Machaca (2004–2006?) 
 Vicente Flores Lorenza Mostacero (2003–2004?)
 Max Paredes (2000–2003)

National Council of Ayllus and Markas of the Qullasuyu (Conamaq)

This parliament or Jacha Ulaka consists of 150 delegates sent from the ayllus of the Greater Collasuyu region. This region is also called Qullakas Asanajaqes. The parliament holds regular meetings at Tiwanaku and Cochabamba in Bolivia and other places. It was first constituted on March 22, 1997, and was composed of the regional organizations: Jatun Quillakas Asanajaqis, J'acha Carangas, Charka Qhara Qhara, First Nations' Council of Potosi's Ayllus, Qhara Qhara, Ayllus of Cochabamba, Jach'a Suyu Pakajak'i, Urus, Saoras-Chuwis, and Kallawayas.

Council of Mallkus and Amautas of the Parliament of the Qullana

There is also an institution called the Council of Mallkus and Amautas which acts rather like an upper house consisting of four delegates from each of the modern states that comprise the Qullakas Asanajaqes. During the period 2000 - 2003 those delegates were:

Jalsuri (Bolivia)

 Max Paredes
 Julian Bautista
 Félix López
 Representative of Potosí (Quechua)

Araxa (Peru)

 Teofilo Lauracio
 Esteban Mamani
 Fortunato Escobar
 Gladiz Vázques

Jalanta (Chile)

 Magdalena Choque
 Crispín Chura
 Joaquin García
 Alejandra Flores

Aynacha (Argentina)

 Gerónimo Alvarez
 Celina Avendaño
 Saturnino Mamani
 Natalia Zana Pura

Quotations

References
https://web.archive.org/web/20051125113751/http://www.aymaranet.org/ParlamentoAymara10.html
https://web.archive.org/web/20050903171723/http://www.aymara.org/chaxwa/noticias02/ppqa.html
http://www.llacta.org/organiz/coms/com629.htm
https://web.archive.org/web/20070107183218/http://www.renacerbol.com.ar/varios/notasextras/ingles01.htm
La Ciudad (Bolivia Edition) - May 25, 2004

 
Politics of Bolivia
Titles of national or ethnic leadership